The internal conflict in Azawad has been a conflict in Northern Mali between the MNLA, a Tuareg nationalist group, and a coalition of Islamist groups. The conflict began when Northern Mali declared itself independent from the government, creating the unrecognized state of Azawad. The Islamists and MNLA formed an alliance in combatting the Malian government. An internal conflict sprung up over the imposing of sharia law in the new state and the MNLA distancing itself from the coalition to a democratic state. Islamists gained popularity amongst anti-Tuareg tribes which helped them overthrow MNLA authority in Gao. Both sides clashed repeatedly leading to the Battle of Gao, where the MNLA were driven from the North's two main cities, Gao and Timbuktu. The MNLA soon lost all of its strongholds in the North in a matter of months. They went into hiding secretly gaining support and strength. The beginning of 2013 led to the start of the French intervention in Mali that ousted the Islamists from the North's cities and brought back Malian authority. The MNLA supported the French and Chadian forces in military operations against Islamists' sanctuaries in the mountains. The MNLA recaptured several important towns in the Kidal Region but refused to disarm or hand them over to the Malian government. A series of Islamist-sponsored terror attacks plagued MNLA forces for siding with the French. Checkpoints and bases were targeted with suicide bombings that targeted MNLA members. A peace deal was reached with the Malian army in June that let the army transverse freely in MNLA-occupied zones that were under Malian jurisdiction. Ethnic violence sprung over the murder of a Tuareg Government officer's family. The MNLA responded by harassing and murdering Fulani civilians, who constitute a majority of Islamist rebels. The Islamists stepped up their attacks in one such instance massacring 30 Tuareg merchants. The MNLA has since been battling Islamists.

Prelude - Conflict
Since its Independence in April 2012, the MNLA has been skeptical of Islamist influence over their new state's future and the implementation of sharia law. Various countries including France have denounced the MNLA's cooperation with terror groups and refused to recognize its new status due to various incidents in its fight against the Malian government which included a massacre that killed 93 Malian soldiers allegedly carried out by Islamists. Two main incidents occurred on the streets of Gao that caused confusion when civilians waving the Malian flag were fired upon by MNLA members which was denied by the MNLA itself, blamed on Islamists. Many did not support the new state of Azawad and Tuareg dominance over their land. Islamists popularity and influence grew in numbers eventually outnumbering MNLA defenders in Gao. The city was taken on June 27, over an argument that escalated into a full-scale battle. The MNLA Secretary General Bilal Ag Acherif was wounded in the battle that also killed four colonels. The MNLA's headquarters and any government building was looted along with the Azawad flag being replaced with sharia. Timbuktu was evacuated by the MNLA a day later after an ultimatum to leave. Resistance grew against Islamic rule in MNLA supported towns but never posed a great threat.  On 16 November, the MNLA launched an offensive attack to reclaim their former city base of Gao from Islamists. They did not make it far before their army routed and was chased across the Niger border. Nine MNLA members were wounded, including one seriously. Islamists casualties were 13 dead. Four days later the Islamists launched their own offensive against towns with MNLA presence. The town of Ménaka's defenders were capitulated in a two-day siege that killed one MNLA member and seven pro-MNLA selfdefense volunteers including a prominent political leader Alwabegat Ag Salakatou. Its disputed how many Islamists were killed. The MNLA hoped to establish Ménaka as a central base from which to launch counter-attacks. In December, the now displaced MNLA began peace talks with the Malian government and relinquished its previous goal for Independence in favor of self-rule in Northern Mali. Almost half of the MNLA's combatants deserted for better pay in Islamists factions since the declaration of Independence in April 2012. At this time the MNLA controlled no big localities and was only strong in rural desert areas in the North, having been driven off from cities in the South. Troop build ups in the MNLA ranks were reportedly preparing for another offensive.

At the start of 2013, the MNLA retook its key town of Kidal after it was abandoned by French air-strikes. The Azawad flag was raised in every town they took each one without a fight. Islamists guerrillas operating the Adrar des Ifoghas mountains launched an offensive of their own terrorizing MNLA dominated towns with suicide bombings. The first hit the town of Khalil on 22 February, after an explosion ripped at an MNLA checkpoint killing three members. The second in that week killed seven members at another checkpoint in Kidal. Fighting resumed the next month leading to the Battle of In Arab. Five members were killed in a day long battle with an elite terrorist brigade led by Mokhtar belMokhtar, the Signatories of Blood. In June 2013, the MNLA agreed on a cease-fire with the Malian army allowing them to have authority over MNLA occupied towns, granting autonomy for Tuareg civilians, and dis-arming the MNLA with an exception for self-defense purposes into a political organization. The MNLA also agreed upon taking back its claim for Independence instead for greater autonomy. The peace-deal lasted over three months before both sides claimed it was breached. In November, the Islamists suspected murder of members of a Tuareg Malian army general's family led to an ethnic conflict between MNLA Tuareg and Islamists dominated Fulani. The situation escalated in February 2014, when 30-35 Tuareg merchants were massacred at the hands of Fulani Islamists. Reprisal attacks targeting Fulani Islamists resumed into an armed confrontation that killed a MNLA member.

Social conflict

History of Azawad
2010s in Mali